Chafer may refer to:
 Chafer beetle, the common name for several species of scarab beetles
 Chafing dish, a food warming dish

People with the name 
 Adrian Chafer (born 1991), Spanish musician
 Daniel Alberto Chafer (born 1981), Argentine footballer
 George William Chafer (1894–1966), British soldier
 Lewis Sperry Chafer (1871–1952), American theologian
 Nico Cháfer (born 1991), Spanish footballer

See also 
 
 Chaffer
 Shafer